Sadok and 48 Dominican martyrs from Sandomierz were Roman Catholic, Dominican martyrs killed by Mongols (Golden Horde) during the Second Mongol invasion of Poland in 1260. As homage to the deaths of these martyrs, Polish Dominican friars were given special dispensation allowing the usage of red belts in their habits.

List of martyrs
 Blessed Sadok – prior, priest
 Blessed Malachy – preacher, priest
 Blessed Paul – vicar, priest
 Blessed Andrew – questor, priest
 Blessed Peter – priest
 Blessed James – priest
 Blessed Abel – receivership, priest
 Blessed Simon – priest
 Blessed Clemens – priest
 Blessed Barnaba (I) – priest
 Blessed Elijah – priest
 Blessed Bartholomew – priest
 Blessed Lukas – priest
 Blessed Matthew – priest
 Blessed John – priest
 Blessed Barnaba (II) – priest
 Blessed Philip – priest
 Blessed Onuphrius – cleric (seminary student)
 Blessed Dominic – cleric (seminary student) 
 Blessed Michael – cleric (seminary student)
 Blessed Matthew – cleric (seminary student) 
 Blessed Maur – cleric (seminary student)
 Blessed Timothy – cleric (seminary student)
 Blessed Gordian – profes 
 Blessed Felician – profes 
 Blessed Mark – profes
 Blessed John – profes
 Blessed Ghervaz – profes
 Blessed Christopher – profes
 Blessed Donatus – profes
 Blessed Medart – profes
 Blessed Valentinus – profes
 Blessed Joachim – deacon
 Blessed Joseph – deacon
 Blessed Stephen – subdeacon
 Blessed Thaddeus – subdeacon
 Blessed Moses – subdeacon
 Blessed Abraham – subdeacon
 Blessed Basil – subdeacon
 Blessed David – cleric (seminary student)
 Blessed Aaron – cleric (seminary student)
 Blessed Benedict – cleric (seminary student)
 Blessed Daniel – novice
 Blessed Tobias – novice
 Blessed Makarios – novice
 Blessed Raphael – novice
 Blessed Isaiah – novice
 Blessed Cyril – novice
 Blessed Jeremiah (Sutor?)

See also
 Sacking of Sandomierz (1260)
 The Lesser Polish Way

References 

1260 deaths
Polish beatified people
Polish Dominicans
People from Sandomierz
13th-century Roman Catholic martyrs
People executed by the Golden Horde
Venerated Catholics
Beatifications by Pope Pius VII